Rohner is a surname. Notable people with the surname include:

 Clayton Rohner (born 1957), American actor
 Joop Rohner (1927–2005), Dutch water polo player

 Marshall Rohner (1963–2005), American guitarist
 Urs Rohner (born c.1959), Swiss lawyer, businessman and banker